Pardini is an Italian surname, and may refer to:

People
Notable people with the surname include:
A. J. Pardini (1932–2011), American politician
Julio César Pardini (born 1984), Mexican footballer
Lou Pardini (born 1952), American singer-songwriter
Olivier Pardini (born 1985), Belgian cyclist
Stefano Pardini (born 1975), Italian footballer

Companies
Pardini Arms, Italian firearms manufacturer